The 1964 Pacific hurricane season was the least active Pacific hurricane season on record since 1953. The season officially started on May 15 in the eastern Pacific and June 1 in the Central Pacific Hurricane Center's area of responsibility and lasted until November 30 in both regions. These dates conventionally delimit the period of each year when most tropical cyclones form in the northeastern Pacific Ocean.

During this season only six tropical storms developed, of which two intensified into hurricanes. Of the two hurricanes, one reached Category 2 intensity of the Saffir-Simpson Hurricane Wind Scale. No storms reached major hurricane status (Category 3 or higher on the hurricane scale), an unusual occurrence. The first tropical cyclone of the season, Tropical Storm Natalie made landfall in Mexico in early to mid-July. About a week later, Hurricane Odessa became the strongest storm of the season in terms of wind speed. Tropical Storm Prudence brought high waves to Southern California, while becoming the strongest storm of the year in terms of barometric pressure. In addition, Tropical Storm Tillie produced severe flooding to much of the Southwestern United States, in particular in Arizona in early to mid-September.



Seasonal summary 

With only six named storms, the season was well below the 1949–2006 average of 13 named storms and is the second fewest storms in the hurricane database, only behind the 1953 Pacific hurricane season, in which just 5 storms were observed. Moreover, 1964 is the least active season since the satellite era began in the basin in 1961. Of the six storms that formed, three formed in July, two developed in August, and the final storm of the year existed in early to mid-September. Only two tropical cyclones reached hurricane status, compared to the modern-day average of seven. Furthermore, 1964 is also one of the few seasons without a major hurricane. This season was part of a decade-long absence of major hurricanes; during the 1960s, only one major hurricane was observed and none were noted from 1960–1966. However, it is possible that some storms were missed due to the lack of satellite coverage in the region; at that time, satellite data was still scarce, and 1964 is still two years shy of the start of the geostationary satellite era, which began in 1966. Some efforts are underway to improve the records for this time period; however, this process will likely take years to complete. Also, the Pacific Decadal Oscillation (PDO) was in the midst of a cold phase during this time period, which tends to suppress Pacific hurricane activity. During the season, tropical cyclone advisories were issued by the Naval Fleet Warning Central (NFWC) in Alameda, which held responsibility for the basin until 1970.

Systems

Tropical Storm Natalie 

The next day, July 7, the NFWC reported that Natalie made landfall near Mazatlan with winds of  just before dissipating. No known impact was recorded.

Hurricane Odessa 

Hurricane Odessa formed on July 15. Later on July 18, it turned towards the northwest, and shortly thereafter, the hurricane turned towards the west-southwest. Odessa dissipated at 1800 UTC on July 19.

Tropical Storm Prudence 

Moving generally west-northwest, Prudence initially failed to intensify, and maintained winds of 50 mph (85 km/h) for a few days. Prudence held on to this intensity until July 23, when it encountered cooler sea surface temperatures. Shortly before dissipating, the system turned back towards the west. Tropical Storm Prudence dissipated on July 24. Even though Prudence never made landfall, the cyclone produced high waves along the California coast, especially along Newport Beach.

Tropical Storm Roslyn 

A tropical depression formed on August 21. While maintaining its intensity, Roslyn drifted west-northwest. The storm dissipated at 1800 UTC on August 22.

Tropical Depression Silvia 

After tropical cyclogenesis, the storm quickly weakened. By August 24, the NFWC had stopped monitoring the system. The depression was named by the NFWC as it resembled to be a tropical storm. However, post-storm analysis show that Silvia never attained tropical storm status.

Tropical Storm Tillie 

The last tropical cyclone of the season, Tropical Storm Tillie, developed on September 7. Tropical Storm Tillie dissipated at 0600 UTC on September 9 off the coast of California, having only been a tropical cyclone for just over two days.

The storm's residual moisture was adverted over southern Arizona, allowing a passing cold front to trigger widespread showers and thunderstorms on the evening of September 9. The most significant rainfall was reported along southeastern Arizona, southern New Mexico, and around El Paso. Amado sustained  in a 72‑hour time span. Furthermore, Tucson received  of rainfall in a 24-hour period between September 9–10, and two locations—one in the Catalina Mountain foothills and one near Sahuarita—recorded  of precipitation. Coupled with rain during the previous week, the Santa Cruz River produced heavy runoff, with peak flows of  recorded near Cortaro.

Storm names 
The following names were used for named storms that formed in the eastern Pacific in 1964. No names were retired from this list. This is a part of list 2, which was used from 1960 to 1965. Names that were not assigned are marked in gray.

See also 

 Tropical cyclone
 List of Pacific hurricanes
 1964 Atlantic hurricane season
 1964 Pacific typhoon season
 1964 North Indian Ocean cyclone season
 Australian region cyclone seasons: 1963–64 1964–65
 South Pacific cyclone seasons: 1963–64 1964–65
 South-West Indian Ocean cyclone seasons: 1963–64 1964–65

References 

 
Pacific hurricane seasons
Articles which contain graphical timelines